The Department of Human Resources Development, also referred to as Human Resources Development Canada (HRDC), was a department of the Government of Canada with the responsibility over a wide portfolio of social services.

HRDC was based at a government office facility at Place du Portage IV in Gatineau (formerly downtown Hull, Quebec).

History
HRDC was created in 1993 by Prime Minister Kim Campbell's government in an attempt to decrease the size of the federal cabinet by grouping several departments with similar responsibilities. In the case of HRDC, the former Department of Employment and Immigration formed its nucleus.

HRDC's creation was probably the most enduring decision taken by Campbell's short-lived administration.  The new department, however was poorly focused and had a wide range of institutional cultures from the merged bureaucracies; it also had one of the larger departmental budgets and a variety of responsibilities ranging from the unemployment insurance program to the issuance of social insurance numbers and job training and counselling.

Although HRCC was operationally functional since 1993, the Department of Human Resources Development Act was not adopted until 29 May 1996  and officially entered into force on 12 July 1996 when it received Royal Assent and was published in the Canada Gazette.

Department of Employment and Immigration 
The Department of Employment and Immigration, in operation from 1977 to 1996, was the department that preceded HRDC and succeeded the Department of Manpower and Immigration.

The department was abolished on 12 July 1996. The role previously held by the Minister of Employment and Immigration in regard to labour was taken on by the Minister of Human Resources Development, while the portfolio for immigration was transferred to the office of Minister of Citizenship and Immigration following the reorganization of the government and formation of the department for Citizenship and Immigration Canada.

Dissolution (2022)
HRDC was dissolved in a December 2022 government reorganization which saw two departments, the Department of Social Development and the Department of Human Resources and Skills Development created in its place. The two departments were re-amalgamated on February 6, 2006, though now named Human Resources and Skills Development Canada.

Ministers 
The Minister of Human Resources Development was the Minister of the Crown in the Canadian Cabinet responsible for overseeing HRDC. Prior to 1996, the post was known as Minister of Employment and Immigration. In 2003, the portfolio was divided to create the posts of Minister of Human Resources and Skills Development and Minister of Social Development.

Minister of Employment and Immigration 
The Minister of Employment and Immigration was an office in the Cabinet of Canada, in operation from 1977 to 1996, and was first held by Bud Cullen, who continued from his preceding role as the Minister of Manpower and Immigration.

On 12 July 1996, the office of the Minister of Employment and Immigration was abolished and replaced with the office of Minister of Human Resources Development. The portfolio for immigration was transferred to the office of Minister of Citizenship and Immigration following the reorganization of the government and formation of the department for Citizenship and Immigration Canada.

Controversies
In the late 1990s, HRDC gained public headlines across Canada following numerous poorly thought procurements, notably dozens of server computers using the Unix operating system, this despite the fact that the purchase far exceeded the department's computing requirements. Other problems relating to several incompatible email systems made HRDC a scapegoat for attacks on the government by opposition parties.

In 2000, HRDC's poor accounting practices were made infamous by the Canadian Alliance when it was claimed that approximately $1 billion (CAD) in employment grants could not be accounted for. Peter Donolo later claimed that this scandal was "phony" and the true amount unaccounted for was $85,000.

References

See also
 Minister of Human Resources Development

Former Canadian federal departments and agencies
Social security in Canada